

See also 
 Grindstone
 Millstone
 Grindstone (disambiguation)